Sun Yat-sen Mausoleum Music Stage is a building affiliated to the complex of Sun Yat-sen Mausoleum, located in the southeast of Sun Yat-sen Mausoleum Square in Nanjing, Jiangsu Province, China. The stage was designed by Yang Tingbao and built by the Liyuan Construction Company() for 95,000 RMB donated by the San Francisco Chinese-Americans as well as the Liaoning Province Kuomintang branch. The construction project was started in the fall of 1932 and completed in August, 1933.

Architectural style
The architectural style of the music stage exhibits a combination of Chinese and Western elements. In the use of natural environment and its layout and facade, it fully absorbs the architectural characteristics of ancient Greece, while on the details of spirit screen, musical altar and other buildings, it employs the form of South China's classical gardens. Its plane layout presents a semicircle, whose center is an arc-shaped reinforced concrete stage and a spirit screen. At the back of the stage there is a concrete spirit screen, which follows the style of the traditional Chinese Mountain Five Screens. The surface of the screen is veneered with cement Zhanjia stone. The spirit screen not only serves as stage setting, but also reflexes sound waves. The upper part and two sides of the screen are engraved with moire patterns, below which three dragon heads are engraved, protruding from the screen. At the edge of the stage, there are several wave-shaped stairs, which are filled with soils to grow flowers and grass.

In front of the stage, there is a crescent-shaped lotus pond which is 12.67 meters in radius and is used to collect the rainwater of the open space. Running throughout the year, the pond water strengthens the sound effect of the stage. On both sides of the stage there are some platforms on which reinforced concrete pergolas of wisteria are built. Below the stage, there are rest rooms, wash rooms and store rooms, etc.

In front of the stage is the auditorium. The designer skillfully makes use of the lawn's natural heave from high to low and designs a semi-circle auditorium. Three paths spread along the direction of the concentric arc on the lawn, and five two-meter-wide walkways radiate from the fan-shaped ramp's center; each of the walkways has 45 steps. The lawn is divided into 12 pieces by the paths and walkways, and together it can contain more than 3000 people.

Inside and outside of the walkways each has 36 stand columns, 36 flowerpots and 30 stone benches. There are rectangular stone benches between flowerpots at the same side under the pergola, which are for the audience to sip tea and rest. At the periphery of the pergola there is an arc-shaped moat, with five bridges serving as five passageways of the music stage. The wisteria corridor is spread in a semicircle, forming a rhythm of equidistance and beauty of melody.

See also
Sun Yat-sen Mausoleum
Sun Yat-sen
Kuomintang
spirit screen

References

Further reading

External links

Buildings and structures in Nanjing
Tourist attractions in Nanjing